Une Visite was the first short film made by 23-year-old François Truffaut. It was filmed in Jacques Doniol-Valcroze’s apartment and its crew included Jacques Rivette, Alain Resnais and Truffaut's boyhood friend Robert Lachenay. It was only briefly screened for friends and is the only Truffaut film that has never been available for public viewing since Truffaut was unhappy with it.

Truffaut usually told people that no copies of the film existed, but in 1982 he made a 35mm print of the film and screened it for friends.

Plot
A young man tries unsuccessfully to seduce a young woman with whom he lives.

Cast
Francis Cognany		
Florence Doniol-Valcroze		
Laura Mauri		
Jean-José Richer

External links

References

Films directed by François Truffaut
French short films
Films with screenplays by François Truffaut
1950s French-language films
1950s French films